Jane Duke is an Australian diplomat who was their Ambassador to ASEAN, beginning in August 2016, and was appointed Australian Consul-General Los Angeles in August 2020.

Education and career
Duke earned a Bachelor of Arts in Asian Studies and a Bachelor of Laws from the Australian National University and a Graduate Diploma in Legal Practice from the University of Technology Sydney.

Duke was an immigration counsellor with Australia's Permanent Mission to the United Nations from 2005 to 2008. She was Australia's Deputy High Commissioner to Malaysia from 2011 to 2014. Between postings she worked at the Department of Foreign Affairs and Trade in Canberra.

References

External links 

 
 

Ambassadors of Australia to ASEAN
Australian women ambassadors
Consuls-General of Australia in Los Angeles
Living people
Year of birth missing (living people)
Australian National University alumni